Maraldi is a worn, eroded crater on the western edge of the Sinus Amoris, in the northeast part of the Moon. To the west-southwest is the crater Vitruvius, and to the northwest lies the worn Littrow crater. Just to the northeast of the crater is the dome-like Mons Maraldi rise.

The crater is named after two Italian-born French astronomers: Giovanni Domenico Maraldi and Giacomo F. Maraldi.

Maraldi has a very worn outer wall that is deeply incised and has the appearance of a circular range of peaks rather than a crater rim. The interior has been flooded with basaltic lava, leaving a flat surface with a low albedo. There is a low ridge just to the northwest of the midpoint, and several tiny craters mark the floor surface.

Satellite craters
By convention these features are identified on lunar maps by placing the letter on the side of the crater midpoint that is closest to Maraldi.

The following craters have been renamed by the IAU.
 Maraldi B — See Lucian (crater).
 Maraldi M — See Theophrastus (crater).

References

External links

Maraldi at The Moon Wiki
 

Impact craters on the Moon